Ivan Chiriaev (born August 25, 1984 in Saint Petersburg, Russian Soviet Federative Socialist Republic, USSR) is a Russian basketball player.

Amateur career
Chiriaev had a lot of hype surrounding him going into the 2004 NBA Draft, but was not drafted. Chiriaev played high school basketball at St. Thomas Aquinas in Oakville, Ontario, Canada. He signed with Iowa State University in the US.

Pro career
Chiriaev was a bench player for Dynamo Moscow in the 2004–05 and 2005–06 seasons.  He played the 2006–07 season for MyGuide Amsterdam.

Notes

External links
 http://slam.canoe.ca/Slam/Basketball/NBA/2004/05/09/453205.html
 http://www.hoopshype.com/interviews/chiriaev_sierra.htm
 http://www.nba.com/draft2006/profiles/IvanChiriaev.html

1984 births
Living people
People from Oakville, Ontario
Basketball players from Saint Petersburg
Russian men's basketball players
Russian expatriate basketball people in Canada
Russian expatriate basketball people in the Netherlands
Amsterdam Basketball players
Dutch Basketball League players
Russian expatriate basketball people in the United States
Iowa State Cyclones men's basketball players